Results from Norwegian football in 1940.

Norgesserien 1939/40

Because of World War II, Norgesserien 1939/40 was abandoned after the winter break following the German invasion of Norway on April 9, 1940.

District I

District II, Group A

District II, Group B

District III

District IV, Group A

District IV; Group B

District V, Group A

District V, Group B

District VI

District VII

District VIII

Norwegian Cup

Final

References

 
Seasons in Norwegian football